The Yucatán spiny-tailed iguana (Cachryx defensor) is a species of lizard in the family Iguanidae. It is endemic to northern Yucatán, Mexico.

Habitat
Its natural habitat is tropical and subtropical dry broadleaf forests.

Conservation status
It is threatened by habitat loss.

In the United States

A foot-long specimen was found scurrying across a loading dock on July 29, 2010 at Ford Motor Co.'s Van Dyke Transmission Plant in Sterling Heights, Michigan. The creature was a stowaway in parts crates shipped from the Yucatán peninsula in Mexico. The creature was moved to an enclosure at the Detroit Zoo which it will share with a female black iguana.

References

Cachryx
Endemic reptiles of Mexico
Fauna of the Yucatán Peninsula
Reptiles described in 1866
Taxa named by Edward Drinker Cope
Taxonomy articles created by Polbot
Taxobox binomials not recognized by IUCN